Peter Murray is the Robert Braucher Visiting Professor and Edward R. Johnston Lecturer on Law at Harvard Law School.  He is an authority in the fields of evidence, comparative law, trial advocacy, comparative civil procedure, and admiralty law.  Murray graduated from Harvard Law School (LL.B. magna cum laude, 1967).  He served as Secretary to the Maine Judicial Council from 1969 to 1978 and has been a consultant to the Maine Advisory Committee on Rules of Evidence since 1973.  Murray is a member of the American Law Institute and the American Board of Trial Advocacy.

Interesting facts
Peter Murray is a member of the editorial board of Russian Law Journal.

References

External links
 Biography and Bibliography at Harvard Law School

Harvard Law School alumni
Harvard Law School faculty
Living people
American legal scholars
Year of birth missing (living people)